Abdul Aziz Wains (born 1 January 1932) is a Pakistani former sports shooter. He competed in the 300 metre rifle, three positions event at the 1960 Summer Olympics.

References

External links
 

1932 births
Possibly living people
Pakistani male sport shooters
Olympic shooters of Pakistan
Shooters at the 1960 Summer Olympics
People from Gurdaspur